Echinoplaca pernambucensis is a species of lichen in the family Gomphillaceae. It was described as new to science in 2011. It is found in Brazil.

References

Ostropales
Lichen species
Lichens described in 2011
Lichens of Brazil
Taxa named by John Alan Elix